

List of Ambassadors

Haim Regev 2021-
Aharon Leshno-Yaar 2016 - 
David Walzer 2012 - 2016
Yacov Hadas-Handelsman 2011 - 2012
Ran Curiel 2007 - 2011
Oded Eran 2002 - 2007
Harry Kney-Tal 1999 - 2002

Former Ambassadors - European Economic Community
Yitzhak Minerbi 1978 - 1983 
Eliashiv Ben-Horin 1974 - 1978
Moshe Alon 1969 - 1974
Amiel E. Najar 1960 - 1968
Gideon Rafael 1957 - 1960

References 

European Union
Israel